LFG is a 2021 American documentary film, directed and produced by Andrea Nix Fine and Sean Fine, with Andrea Nix Fine also serving as a writer. It follows Megan Rapinoe, Jessica McDonald, Becky Sauerbrunn, Kelley O'Hara, Christen Press, Sam Mewis and Julie Foudy, as they sue the United States Soccer Federation for pay discrimination. U.S. District Judge R. Gary Klausner in Los Angeles has scheduled a trial for September 15 on the players’ remaining claim of discriminatory work conditions which the U.S. woman's national team were successful in the claim for discriminatory work conditions, which included issues such as hotels, etc. In May 2020, Klausner summarily dismissed the unequal pay portion of the lawsuit.

It had its world premiere at the Tribeca Film Festival on June 17, 2021. It was released on June 24, 2021, by HBO Max.

Title
The acronym LFG stands for the phrase, "Let's fucking go!" which is a rallying call for the team.

Synopsis
It follows Megan Rapinoe, Jessica McDonald, Becky Sauerbrunn, Kelley O'Hara, Christen Press, Sam Mewis and Julie Foudy, as they sue the United States Soccer Federation for pay discrimination.

Production
In March 2021, it was announced Andrea Nix Fine and Sean Fine would direct a documentary film revolving around the U.S. women's national soccer team pay discrimination claim. The film is produced by Everywoman Studios and CNN Films, and distributed by HBO Max.

Release
The film had its world premiere at the Tribeca Film Festival on June 17, 2021. It also screened at AFI Docs on June 23, 2021. It was released on June 24, 2021, by HBO Max.

Reception
LFG received positive reviews from film critics. It holds an 88% approval rating on review aggregator website Rotten Tomatoes, based on 8 reviews, with a weighted average of 9.40/10.
The film has also received negative feedback from some lawyers as the film pays little attention to the legal proceeding regarding the case, and fails to explore the specifics of the court's decision to throw out the case. Journalist Emily Reigart stated that "If you are looking to better understand the legal argument for the athletes’ case, this is not the film for you", whilst the Washington Post said "The film itself is just as one-sided"

References

External links
 

2021 films
2021 documentary films
Documentary films about women
Documentary films about women's sports
Documentary films about misogyny
CNN Films films
HBO Max films
Films directed by Sean Fine and Andrea Nix
2020s English-language films
2020s American films